Pabaneh (also Romanized as Pābaneh and Pā Boneh; also known as Pābanen and Pāy Boneh) is a village in Howmeh Rural District, in the Central District of Bam County, Kerman Province, Iran. At the 2006 census, its population was 59, in 20 families.

References 

Populated places in Bam County